Cameriera bella presenza offresi... (Housemaid) is a 1951 Italian film directed by Giorgio Pastina. Federico Fellini was one of its scriptwriters. The film marked the comeback of Elsa Merlini after a nine years hiatus.

Plot
Misadventures of the maid Maria through several employers. Maria, a beautiful but no longer very young waitress, waiting to steal her boyfriend Filiberto who has been postponing the wedding for fifteen years, during a torrid summer constantly changes employers through newspaper ads, finding herself involved in various misadventures.

She initially works with a lawyer, but is fired when the latter, having learned that he has been betrayed by his wife, accuses her of being complicit in her deception. Then hired by a famous prose actor, she manages to reconcile him with her wife, jealous of an actress whose husband has fallen in love.

On the day of August 15, she finds a job with a traveling salesman who is bedridden by an illness, but the apartment is turned upside down by several untimely visitors. She finally takes up service with a math teacher who practices yoga and dabbles in occultism.

During a séance, she learns that her fiancé's uncle has died. The wedding can thus finally be celebrated, despite the fact that before the ceremony it is known that the uncle's inheritance has belonged to the faithful guardian of the villa.

Cast

 Elsa Merlini as  Maria 
 Gino Cervi as Filiberto Morrucchi 
 Alberto Sordi as  Donato 
 Vittorio De Sica as  Leonardo Leonardi 
 Aldo Fabrizi as  Giovanni Marchetti 
 Peppino De Filippo as  the lawyer
 Eduardo De Filippo as  Raffaele 
 Giulietta Masina as  Ermelinda 
 Delia Scala as  the lawyer's wife
 Titina De Filippo as  the lyric singer
 Isa Miranda as  Angela Leonardi 
 Milly Vitale as  Nandina 
 Armando Migliari as  Leonardi's lawyer
 Aroldo Tieri as Luigino 
 Cesare Fantoni as  Bernanzoni  
 Arturo Bragaglia as  Matteo 
 Bella Starace Sainati as  Celestina  
 Enrico Viarisio as  Camillo  
 Domenico Modugno as  Enrico Marchetti 
 Mariolina Bovo as  Giovanni Marchetti's daughter 
 Vittoria Crispo as  Annetta  
 Dina Sassoli as  Carolina  
 Carlo Ninchi as the priest
 Natale Cirino as the doctor
 Marcella Rovena as  the Countess

References

External links 

1951 films
Italian black-and-white films
1950s Italian-language films
Films set in Italy
Films directed by Giorgio Pastina
Films scored by Alessandro Cicognini
Italian comedy films
1951 comedy films
1950s Italian films